David Vernon may refer to:
David Vernon (professor) (born 1958), professor at the University of Genoa, Italy
David Vernon (writer) (born 1965), Australian writer
David Vernon (English writer) (born 1979), English writer